Llyn Bochlwyd is a lake in Eryri, Wales, in Conwy County Borough. It lies in Cwm Bochlwyd, near Llyn Ogwen in the Glyderau mountain range.

Name and controversy
The name translates as "Lake of the Greycheek". According to a local legend, this is where an old grey stag, fleeing a hunter, miraculously escaped by leaping from a great height into the lake and swimming to safety while holding its grey cheeks above the surface, in order to breathe.

In some English language guidebooks and websites, the lake is referred to as "Lake Australia", as the shape of the lake is said to resemble the map of Australia, from a view point above.

The adoption of a new English name in favour of the pre-existing Welsh name has been criticised as Linguistic discrimination. In 2018 the broadcaster Tudur Owen cited the name change as "erasing history". 

The name change has been cited as part of the debate around preserving historic place-names in law. In 2020, the Shadow Minister for Culture and the Welsh Language, Sian Gwenllian mentioned the lake in raising the possibility of a new bill to preserve Welsh place-names.

References

External links

www.geograph.co.uk : photos of Llyn Bochlwyd and surrounding area

Beddgelert
Bochlwyd
Bochlwyd
Tourism in Conwy County Borough
Tourism in Snowdonia